Novosibirsk State Theater Institute (NSTI) is a state institute located in Novosibirsk, Russia. It was founded in 1960.

Training directions 
There are four specialities in the Institute:

 Musical theater actor
 Dramatical theater and film actor 
 Variety actor
 Drama director

Student Theater 
NSTI has their own student theater created for extra-practice. Srudents stage plays based on novels by Fyodor Dostoyevsky ("The Brothers Karamazovov", "Uncle's dream"),  Tatiana Tolstaya ("Sonya") and classical plays by Robert Thomas ("Eight women"), Jacques Offenbach ("Pierrette et Jacquot") and others. The theater  is located at Krasny Prospekt, 171/4.

Alumni 
 Yuriy Nazarov is a Soviet and Russian actor of theater and cinema.
 Pavel Priluchny is a Russian actor of theater and cinema.
 Andrey Zvyagintsev is a Russian film director and screenwriter. Graduated from the theater school in 1984.
 Vladimir Mashkov is a Soviet and Russian actor and director of cinema
 Aleksei Maklakov is a Soviet and Russian actor and singer, well known in Russia for his role as Praporshchik Shmatko.

Institute departments in Novosibirsk 
 Revolution Street 6
 Lenin Street 24
 Yadrintsevskya Street 66

References

External links
 Ministry of Education of the Novosibirsk Region 

Education in Novosibirsk
Drama schools in Russia
1960 establishments in Russia
Educational institutions established in 1960
Theatres in Novosibirsk